Sleepaway was a piano-driven indie rock band from Buffalo, New York.

History
Sleepaway formed in the spring of 2005.  The band signed to New Jersey independent label No Milk Records in June 2005 and released their debut full-length album Sleepaway on June 6, 2006. It was released in Japan on Fabtone Records.

Their EP and full-length album were recorded with producer Doug White (Gym Class Heroes, The A.K.A.s).

Building a fanbase, Sleepaway embarked on a national tour with 111 Records artist Rookie Of The Year. At the release of their full-length, they took local friends Believe In You with them, meeting up with Zolof The Rock & Roll Destroyer, River City High, and The Transit War for select dates. Their last tour supporting the full length was with The Drama Summer.

Guitarist Mike O'Mara played his last show with the band at FYE in the Walden Galleria, Buffalo, New York.  At the show, posters were given out with each purchase of the band's debut album.

Discography

Studio albums

EPs

Compilations

Members 

Alex Tiberia: vocals, guitar (2005—2006)
Brett Mikoll: keyboard (2005—2006)
Ryan Hoerner: bass guitar (2005—2006)
Shawn Stoyle: drums and percussion (2005—2006)
Mike O'Mara:  guitar (2005–2006)
Scott Twardowski: guitar (2006)

References

External links 
 official Sleepaway website
 Sleepaway at PureVolume
 No Milk Records

Indie rock musical groups from New York (state)
Musical groups from Buffalo, New York